Agelenopsis potteri is a species of funnel weaver in the spider family Agelenidae. Native to North America, it has been introduced into Ukraine, Russia, and Kyrgyzstan.

References

External links

 

Agelenidae
Articles created by Qbugbot
Spiders described in 1846